15& (also known as Fifteen And) was a South Korean duo formed by JYP Entertainment in 2012. The duo consisted of Park Ji-min and Baek Ye-rin. The name means '15' being their age at debut and the '&' in '15&' means that they can have success into the future. They debuted with and released their debut single "I Dream" on October 5, 2012. Following a four-year hiatus which began in February 2015, the group de facto disbanded upon the expiration of both member's contracts with JYP Entertainment in 2019.

History

Formation 
In 2012, Park Ji-min was the first-place winner of the South Korean reality TV competition, "K-pop Star". With the opportunity of signing with three major record labels (YG Entertainment, SM Entertainment and JYP Entertainment), she had chosen to sign with JYP Entertainment on May 21.

When Baek Ye-rin was ten years old, she was introduced as a "R&B genius" on Star King. In 2008, she auditioned with Beyoncé's "Listen" and was accepted as a trainee at the same time as 2PM's Wooyoung and Highlight's Doo-joon. Baek had been a JYP trainee for five years before she officially debuted with Park.

2012–2013: Debut with I Dream and Somebody 
15&'s debut single I Dream was released on October 5, 2012. The duo's debut officially began on October 7, 2012, performing on SBS Inkigayo. On October 12, 2012, 15& held their 'school attack' guerrilla concerts. The girls performed at the Chungdam Middle School, Eonnam Middle School, Sungil Information High School and Dankook University. Supported by KT Corporation's Genie Music, the concert attracted both students and local residents' attendance.

15&'s second single Somebody was released on April 7, 2013. The music video showed the two parodying the "K-Pop Star" judge panel while reacting to staged auditions/cameos by Park Jin-young and some of Park Ji-min's fellow contestants from K-pop Star 1. On April 7, 2013, 15& made their comeback performance on K-pop Star 2 finale with "Somebody". Upon its release on the same day, the song rose to the summit of music charts on Olleh, Melon, Daum and others.

2014–2019: Can't Hide It, Sugar, Love is Madness, and unofficial disbandment 
15&'s third single Can't Hide It was released on April 13. On the same day, they made their comeback performance on K-pop Star 3 finale with "Can't Hide It." It was also revealed that their first album is scheduled to be released in May 2014. 15&'s first album Sugar was released on May 26, 2014. They made their comeback on Mnet's M Countdown on May 29, 2014.

15& released the fourth single Love Is Madness, featuring Kanto of Troy on February 9, 2015. They performed the song for the first time along with other songs on February 14, 2015 for their Valentine's Day concert for singles.

Following four year of hiatus, the expiration and non-renewal of Park Ji-min's contract with JYP Entertainment in August 2019 led to the group's de facto disbanding.

Discography

Studio albums

Singles

Other charted songs

Awards and nominations

Notes

References

External links 
 

2012 establishments in South Korea
JYP Entertainment artists
K-pop music groups
Musical groups established in 2012
Musical groups from Seoul
Pop music duos
South Korean girl groups
South Korean musical duos